Point Peter Creek is a stream in the U.S. state of Georgia. It is a tributary to the St. Marys River.

According to tradition, the name "Point Peter" may be a transfer from Queens County, Nova Scotia.

References

Rivers of Georgia (U.S. state)
Rivers of Camden County, Georgia